The  is an electric multiple unit (EMU) train type operated by the Tokyo subway operator Tokyo Metro on the Tokyo Metro Chiyoda Line in Tokyo, Japan, since November 2010.

Operations
The 16000 series sets are used on the following lines.
 Tokyo Metro Chiyoda Line
 Odakyu Odawara Line ( – )
 Odakyu Tama Line ( – )
 Joban Line ( – )

Design
The 16000 series uses Toshiba-branded synchronous motors with permanent magnets, offering 10% energy savings compared to the motors used in earlier 10000 series trains.

The first 12 sets were manufactured by Kawasaki Heavy Industries in Hyogo Prefecture, but sets 16113 to 16128 were built by Hitachi in Yamaguchi Prefecture.

Sets from 16106 onward feature a modified front end design with the emergency door offset to the left-hand side away from the driver's position.

Sets 16117 onward feature wheelchair spaces in all cars, and use LED lighting throughout.

Formation
, the fleet consists of 37 ten-car sets, formed as shown below, with car 1 at the Yoyogi-Uehara (south) end.

Cars 2, 4, 7, and 9 each have one single-arm pantograph.

Interior

History
The first 16000 series set was delivered in early August 2010. The type entered service on 4 November 2010.

In May 2011, the 16000 series was awarded the 2011 Laurel Prize, presented annually by the Japan Railfan Club.

In April 2012, car 8 (16807) of set 16107 was experimentally fitted with LED interior lighting replacing the normal fluorescent tubes used.

The final set on order, 16137, entered service in October 2017.

Fleet details
Official delivery dates as follows.

References

External links

 Tokyo Metro 16000 series information 

Electric multiple units of Japan
16000 series
Train-related introductions in 2010
Kawasaki multiple units
Hitachi multiple units
1500 V DC multiple units of Japan